Chega may refer to:
Chega, Iran, a village
Chega (political party), a political party in Portugal
Chega!, a report by the Commission for Reception, Truth and Reconciliation in East Timor
"Chega", a 2020 song by Gaia Gozzi